New Times is the sixth studio album released by Violent Femmes in 1994. It is the first album to not feature original drummer Victor DeLorenzo on drums, who had been replaced by Guy Hoffman. "Breakin' Up," a song lead singer Gordon Gano had written years before, was the lead single. Its video received minor airplay on MTV and appears on the band's DVD, Permanent Record - Live & Otherwise. The album did not sell well, but featured many of the Femmes' most musically complex and lyrically inventive songs, including "4 Seasons," and concert staple "I'm Nothing."
"I'm Nothing" appeared in the movie Bickford Shmeckler's Cool Ideas.

Track listing

Personnel 
Violent Femmes
 Gordon Gano – vocals (1-13), electric and acoustic guitars (1-5, 7–12), violin (8, 10), organ (13), baglama (12)
 Brian Ritchie – electric bass guitar (1, 2, 4, 9, 11), acoustic bass guitar (3, 5), upright bass (6, 8, 10, 12, 13), electric guitar (3), acoustic piano (4), electric piano (11), organ (9), reed organ (3, 12), electric sitar (2, 10), nose flute (4), theremin (6), keyboards (2, 6), electronics (6), baglama (12), vocals (1-5, 9, 12)
 Guy Hoffman – drums and percussion (1-5, 8–13), vocals (1-5, 8, 9, 11, 12)
 Luisa Mann – vocals (10)

Charts

References

1994 albums
Violent Femmes albums
Elektra Records albums